Hans Eberhard Mayer (born 2 February 1932 in Nuremberg) is a German medieval historian, specializing in the Crusades.

Career
Hans Eberhard Mayer is an international expert on the history of the Crusades. He is currently the Professor of Medieval and Modern History at the University of Kiel. He was elected to the American Philosophical Society in 1978. He was honored in the work Montjoie: studies in Crusade history in honour of Hans Eberhard Mayer (1997).

He was a member of the Monumenta Germaniae Historica between 1956 and 1967. He was a visiting fellow at the German Historical Institute in Rome in 1961. He was a visiting fellow in 1965 and visiting scholar in 1970 to Dumbarton Oaks in Washington, D.C., lecturer at the University of Innsbruck between 1964 and 1967, visiting professor at Yale University in 1971, and member of the Institute for Advanced Study in Princeton, New Jersey, between 1972 and 1973.

Works
The works of Mayer include the following.
Bibliographie zur Geschichte der Kreuzzüge (1960). A comprehensive bibliography of the Crusades.
Geschichte der Kreuzzg̈e (1968).
Select Bibliography on the Crusades (1989). Compiled with Joyce McLellan. In Volume VI of the Wisconsin Collaborative History of the Crusades, edited by Kenneth M. Setton.
 Die Kanzlei der lateinischen Könige von Jerusalem (1996).

References

Historians of the Crusades
1932 births
Writers from Nuremberg
Living people
20th-century German historians
German male non-fiction writers
Corresponding Fellows of the Medieval Academy of America
21st-century German historians
Members of the American Philosophical Society